Zuhair Murad (born in July 1971) is a Lebanese fashion designer. He was born in 1971 in Ras Baalbek, Lebanon.

Biography 
Zuhair Murad was born to a Melkite Catholic family in Ras Baalbek. Shortly after high school, Murad moved to Paris, where he obtained his degree in fashion.

In 1999, Murad made his first appearance on the catwalks of Rome with a collection that led to his participation in the Italian calendar. In 1995, Murad opened his third head shop in Beirut. His lines encompass haute couture, ready-to-wear and accessories. Two boutiques (including showrooms) have been opened; the first in Beirut on Charles Helou Avenue and the second on rue François I in Paris. He also has a showroom in Milan on the Via Borgogna.

Celebrities like Adele, Marion Cotillard, Taylor Swift, Carrie Underwood, Ivana Trump, Cheryl Fernandez-Versini, Beyoncé Knowles, Jennifer Lopez, Kellie Pickler, Najwa Karam, Shakira, Katy Perry, Christina Applegate, Vanessa Williams, Ana Ortiz, have worn his creations. He has also dressed the likes of Najwa Karam in her video clips "Lashhad Hobbak" and "MaFi Noum". Priyanka Chopra wore a white embellished strapless gown by Zuhair Murad at her maiden Oscars in 2016. Miley Cyrus was seen wearing one of his creations at the Academy Awards, and Christina Aguilera and Jennifer Lopez wore his creations at the 2011 Golden Globe Awards. He also designed Miss France Chloé Mortaud's dress for Miss Universe 2009 and 5 dresses for the final of Miss France 2010. Florence Welch was seen wearing one of his creations during the Brits awards; a silver silk dress with gold and silver beaded designs.

Nina Dobrev, Christina Aguilera, Wanda Sykes and singer Jewel were seen wearing Zuhair Murad dresses at the 2010 Emmy Awards. Kerry Washington wore one of his gowns at the 2011 Emmy Awards. Princess al-Taweel of Saudi Arabia wore his creation when she attended the wedding of Prince William and Catherine, Duchess of Cambridge.

Blake Lively was also wearing a Zuhair Murad dress from his Spring 2012 Couture collection at the worldwide premier of her movie "SAVAGES" at Westwood Village. She had also previously been seen in a Zuhair Murad dress in a season 4 episode of Gossip Girl entitled 'Juliet doesn't live here anymore. Kristen Stewart wore a Zuhair Murad dress at the 2012 Toronto Film Festival for a screening of her 2012 film, On the Road and also at the premiere in Los Angeles of her film, The Twilight Saga: Breaking Dawn – Part 2.

French actress Marion Cotillard wore a floral Zuhair Murad dress from his Fall 2012 collection at the 2013 Critics' Choice Awards.

References

External links

Official website

1971 births
Living people
Lebanese fashion designers
Artists from Beirut
Fashion designers from Paris
Lebanese Melkite Greek Catholics